Pontanus may refer to:

 a Latin pen name of the German Lutheran pastor Michael Brüggemann (1583 – 1654)
 the Italian humanist Giovanni Gioviano Pontano, commonly known as Iovianus Pontanus
 Johan Isaksson Pontanus, author of the 1631 Rerum danicarum historia 
 Pontanus (crater)
 Pontanus (bug), see List of Tingini genera